In the Hebrew Bible, Tophet or Topheth is a location in Jerusalem in the Valley of Hinnom (Gehenna), where worshipers engaged in a ritual involving "passing a child through the fire", most likely child sacrifice. Traditionally, the sacrifices have been ascribed to a god named Moloch. The Bible condemns and forbids these sacrifices, and the tophet is eventually destroyed by king Josiah, although mentions by the prophets Jeremiah, Ezekiel, and Isaiah suggest that the practices associated with the tophet may have persisted.

Most scholars agree that the ritual performed at the tophet was child sacrifice, and they connect it to similar episodes throughout the Bible and recorded in Phoenicia (whose inhabitants were referred to as Canaanites in the Bible) and Carthage by Hellenistic sources. There is disagreement about whether the sacrifices were offered to a god named "Moloch". Based on Phoenician and Carthaginian inscriptions, a growing number of scholars believe that the word moloch refers to the type of sacrifice rather than a deity. There is currently a dispute as to whether these sacrifices were dedicated to Yahweh rather than a foreign deity.

Archaeologists have applied the term "tophet" to large cemeteries of children found at Carthaginian sites that have traditionally been believed to house the victims of child sacrifice, as described by Hellenistic and biblical sources. This interpretation is controversial, with some scholars arguing that the tophets may have been children's cemeteries, rejecting Hellenistic sources as anti-Carthaginian propaganda. Others argue that not all burials in the tophet were sacrifices.

The tophet and its location later became associated with divine punishment in Jewish eschatology.

Etymology 
There is no consensus on the etymology of tophet, a word which only occurs eight times in the Masoretic Text. The word may be derived from the Aramaic word  meaning "hearth", "fireplace", or "roaster", a proposal first made by William Robertson Smith in 1887. Some have suggested that the word has been altered via using the vocalization of  "shame." Others derive the word from the Hebrew root  "to set (on fire)", cognate with Ugaritic  "to set." A new proposal has been made to interpret the term as "place of vow" by Robert M. Kerr.

The Talmud (Eruvin 19a) and Jerome derive the name from a Hebrew verb meaning "to seduce". The historically most significant etymology, followed by both Jewish and Christian exegetes until the modern period, was made by the 11th-century CE rabbi Rashi, who derived the term from Hebrew  "drum," claiming that the drums were beaten during the sacrifice to Moloch, deriving his ideas from Plutarch's description of Carthaginian sacrifice. This derivation is, however, morphologically impossible.

Biblical and Levantine references

In the Bible

The tophet is attested 8 times in the Hebrew Bible, mostly to designate a place of ritual fire or burning, but sometimes as a place name. In 2 Kings, King Josiah  The text includes the destruction of the Tophet among Josiah's other removal of "deviant" religious practices from Israel as part of a far reaching religious reform. However, the continued condemnation of both the tophet and related practices by prophets such as Jeremiah and  Ezekiel suggests that the practice may have continued after Josiah's reform, with a mention of the tophet by Isaiah suggesting it may have even continued after the Babylonian exile. Prior to Josiah's reform, the ritual of passing a child through the fire is mentioned, without specifying that it took place at the tophet, as having been performed by the Israelite kings Ahaz and Manasseh:

Both kings perform the sacrifices when faced with the prospect of wars. The sacrifices appear to have been to Yahweh, the god of Israel, and to have been performed in the tophet.

The tophet is condemned repeatedly by name in the Book of Jeremiah, and the term is especially associated with that book of the bible. An example is at :

Jeremiah associates the tophet with Baal; however, other sources all associate it with Moloch.

P. Xella argues that no fewer than twenty-five passages in the Hebrew Bible show the Israelites and Canaanites sacrificing their children, including passages in Deuteronomy, (Dt. 12:13, 18:10), Leviticus (Lev. 18:21, 20:2-5), 2 Kings, 2 Chronicles, Isaiah, Ezra, Psalm 106, and the Book of Job. In , king Mesha of Moab burns his first-born son as an offering while besieged by the Israelites:

This act has been compared with Greco-Roman sources discussing the Phoenicians and Carthaginians engaging in the same or a similar practice in times of danger (see below). It appears to have been performed for the Moabite god Kemosh.

Extra-Biblical attestations
There is no archaeological evidence for the Tophet at Jerusalem, so that we are reliant on the biblical descriptions to understand it. Archaeology has not yet securely identified any Tophets in the Levant, but there is other evidence for child sacrifice there. Ancient Egyptian inscriptions from the second millennium BCE attest the practice in the Levant. A late 8th-century BCE Phoenician inscription from İnçirli in Turkey may indicate that first born sons were sacrificed there along with sheep and horses. The sacrifice of first-born sons in times of crisis appears to be dealt with at length in the inscription, although the precise context is unclear.

Greco-Roman sources also reference child sacrifice, such as an attempt at Tyre to revive a custom of sacrificing a boy during Alexander the Great's Siege of Tyre in 332 BCE, recorded by first century CE Roman historian Quintus Curtius Rufus. The church historian Eusebius (3rd century CE) quotes from Philo of Byblos's Phoenician history that:

Theories
Although a minority of scholars has argued that the tophet ritual described in the Bible was a harmless activity that did not involve sacrificing any children, the majority of scholars agree that the Bible depicts human sacrifice as occurring at the tophet. Modern scholarship has described sacrifice at the Tophet as a mulk or mlk sacrifice. The term appears to derive from a verb meaning "presentation as an offering" from the root  "to offer, present" and found in Phoenician and Carthaginian inscriptions in the phrases  "sacrifice a human,"  "to sacrifice a citizen", and  "sacrifice in place of flesh." Lawrence Stager and Samuel Wolff argue that the term "refers to a live sacrifice of a child or animal."

The god to whom these sacrifices was directed is disputed in modern scholarship, with a dispute arising over whether the sacrifices were part of the cult of Yahweh. Traditionally, the god to whom the sacrifices were offered has been said to be Molech, supposedly an underworld god whose name means king. The Bible connects the Tophet with Moloch in two later texts, 2 Kings 23:10 and Jeremiah 32:25. Lindsay Cooper writes in support of this connection that "The location of the Jerusalem tofet outside the city's eastern wall, at the traditional entrance to the netherworld, explicitly connects child sacrifice with the cult of death." However, while scholars recognize the existence of an underworld deity called "M-l-k" with various vocalizations (e.g. Molech, Milcom) as well as an Akkadian term  for the shades of the dead, there is no evidence to connect these deities or shades to human sacrifice. Later Phoenician and Punic sacrifices of children called mlk in inscriptions or described by Greco-Roman sources are not associated with these gods. On the basis of the word  meaning "to sacrifice" "an increasing number of scholars now take the biblical traditions to attest not to the offering of children in fiery sacrifices to the deity “Molek”, but rather to the sacrifice of children as “mlk” offerings to another deity." On the basis of the stories of Abraham and Jephthah offering their children to Yahweh, as well as Micah 6:6-7 and other passages, Francesca Stavrakopoulou argues that the offerings were in fact for Yahweh rather than for a foreign deity.

Association with punishment

The location of the tophet, the valley of Gehenna, subsequently became a place of punishment in the eschatology of Jewish Apocalypticism, something found in the 3rd- or 4th-century BCE Book of Enoch (1 Enoch 26:4; 27:2–3). The Talmud, discussing the passage in Isaiah, states that whoever commits evil will fall there (Eruvin 19a).

Carthage and the western Mediterranean

Various Greek and Roman sources describe the Carthaginians as engaging in the practice of sacrificing children by burning as part of their religion. These descriptions were compared to those found in the Hebrew Bible. The ancient descriptions were seemingly confirmed by the discovering of the so-called "Tophet of Salambô" in Carthage in 1921, which contained the urns of cremated children. However, modern historians and archaeologists debate the reality and extent of this practice. Some scholars propose that all remains at the Tophet were sacrificed, whereas others propose that only some were.

Archaeological evidence

 
In Phoenician sites throughout the Western Mediterranean (except for Spain and Ibiza), archaeology has revealed fields full of buried urns containing the burnt remains of human infants and lambs, covered by carved stone monuments. These fields are conventionally referred to as "tophets" by archaeologists, after the location in the Bible. When Carthaginian inscriptions refer to these locations, they use the terms bt (house, temple or sanctuary) or qdš (shrine), not "tophet". Archaeology reveals two "generations" of Punic tophets: those founded by Phoenician colonists between 800 and 400 BCE; and those founded under Carthaginian influence (direct or indirect) in North Africa from the 4th century BCE onward.
 
No Carthaginian literary texts survive that would explain or describe what rituals were performed at the tophet. Archaeological evidence shows that the remains could consist of human infants or lambs, often mixed with small portions of other animals, including cows, pigs, fish, birds, and deer. The proportion of lamb to human remains differs by site. At Carthage, 31% of the urns contained lambs; at Tharros it was 47%. Analysis of the bone fragments provides some information about the remains. In a sample of seventy infants from the tophet at Carthage, 37% were identified as male and 54% as female. The age of the children and whether they had died before they were interred is controversial (see below). The lambs are usually between one and three months old; this might indicate that offerings were made at a specific time following the lambing (February/March and October/November). The bone fragments were subjected to uneven temperatures, indicating that they were burnt on an open-air pyre over the course of several hours. The remains were then collected and placed in an urn, sometimes mixing in bones from other infants or lambs - suggesting that multiple infants/lambs were burnt on the same pyre. Sometimes jewellery or amulets were added to the urn. The urn was placed in the ground, in holes cut into the bedrock or within boxes made from stone slabs. In some cases a stone monument was set up above the urn. This could take the form of a stele, cippus, or throne, often with figural decoration and an inscription. In a few occasions, a chapel was built as well. Steles are oriented toward the east.

The figural decoration on the stone monuments takes different forms in different regions. In Carthage, geometric patterns were preferred. In Sardinia, human figures are more common. Inscriptions are most common in the Tophet of Salammbó at Carthage, where there are thousands of examples. There are some from other tophets as well. Matthew McCarty cites CIS I.2.511 as a typical inscription: 
To Lady Tanit, face of Baal, and to Lord Baal Hammon: [that] which Arisham son of Bodashtart, son of Bodeshmun vowed (ndr); because he (the god) heard his (Arisham's) voice, he blessed him. 
Thus, these texts present the monument as a votive offering to the gods, in thanks for favor received from them. Sometimes the final clause instead reads "may he (the god) hear his voice," (i.e. in expectation of a future favor). The individual making the offering is almost always a single individual, nearly always male. The dead child is never mentioned. Tanit appears only in examples from Carthage. Other inscriptions refer to the ritual as mlk or molk. The meaning of this term is uncertain, but it appears to be the same word as the Biblical term "Molech" discussed above. The inscriptions distinguish between mlk b'l / mlk ʿdm (molk of a citizen/person) and mlk ʿmr (molk of a lamb).

Over a hundred tophets have been identified. The earliest examples were established at Carthage, Malta, Motya in western Sicily, and Tharros in southern Sardinia, when the Phoenicians first settled in these areas in the ninth century BCE. The largest known tophet, the Tophet of Salammbô at Carthage, seems to have been established at this time and continued in use for at least a few decades after the city's destruction in 146 BCE. The stone markers first appeared at Salammbô around 650 BCE and spread to Motya and Tharros around 600 BCE. Between the fifth and third centuries BCE, tophets became more common in southern Sardinia and the Carthaginian hinterland, as Phoenician settlement expanded. In Sicily and Sardinia, tophets slowly went out of use in the third and second centuries BCE, following the establishment of Roman control in the First Punic War. In the same period in North Africa, a large number of new tophets were established particularly in inland Tunisia. Many of these tophets remained in use after the fall of Carthage in 146 BCE. In the late first and second centuries CE, migration resulting from military deployment patterns led to the establishment of new tophets in Tunisia and eastern Algeria. In the Roman period, inscriptions name the god to which the monuments were dedicated as Saturn. In addition to infants, some of these tophets contain offerings only of goats, sheep, birds, or plants; many of the worshipers have Libyan rather than Punic names. Their use appears to have declined in the second and third centuries CE.

Greco-Roman sources
Greco-Roman sources frequently criticize the Carthaginians for engaging in child sacrifice. The earliest references to the practice are bare references in Sophocles and the Pseudo-Platonic dialogue, Minos, probably of the fourth century BCE. The late fourth century BCE philosopher Theophrastus claimed that the Syracusan tyrant Gelon had demanded that the Carthaginians abandon the practice after he defeated them in the Battle of Himera (480 BC).

The first detailed account comes from Cleitarchus, an early third-century BCE historian of Alexander the Great, who is quoted by a scholiast as saying:
 Phoenicians, and above all Carthaginians, worship Kronos; if they wish to achieve something big, they devote a child of theirs, and in the case of success, sacrifice it to the god. There is a bronze statue of Kronos among them, which stands upright with open arms and palms of its hands facing upwards above a bronze brazier on which the child is burnt. When the flames reach the body, the victim’s limbs stiffen and the tense mouth almost seems like it is laughing until, with a final spasm, the child falls in the brazier.Cleitarchus FGrH no. 137, F 9

The first century BCE Greek historian Diodorus Siculus writes that, when the Carthaginians were besieged by Agathocles of Syracuse in 310 BCE, the Carthaginians responded by sacrificing large numbers of children according to an old custom they had abandoned:
They also alleged that Kronos had turned against them inasmuch as in former times they had been accustomed to sacrifice to this god the noblest of their sons, but more recently, secretly buying and nurturing children, they had sent these to the sacrifice; and when an investigation was made, some of those who had been sacrificed were discovered to have been substituted by stealth. ... In their zeal to make amends for the omission, they selected two hundred of the noblest children and sacrificed them publicly; and others who were under suspicion sacrificed themselves voluntarily, in number not less than three hundred. There was in the city a bronze image of Kronos, extending its hands, palms up and sloping towards the ground, so that each of the children when placed thereon rolled down and fell into a sort of gaping pit filled with fire. Elsewhere in the Bibliotheca Diodorus claims that wealthy Carthaginians would purchase infant slaves to offer in lieu of their own children.

The writer Plutarch  (c. 46–120 CE) also mentions the practice:

Several Christian authors allude to the practice in the early centuries CE. The Christian apologist Tertullian, about 200 CE, states that although the priests who sacrificed children had been crucified by a Roman procurator, "that holy crime persists in secret". Another Christian writer, Minucius Felix, claims that Punic women aborted their children as a form of sacrifice.

Controversy
The degree and existence of Carthaginian child sacrifice is controversial. Some archaeologists and historians argue that the literary and archaeological evidence indicates that all remains in the tophets were sacrificed. Sabatino Moscati and other scholars have argued that the tophets were cemeteries for premature or short-lived infants who died naturally and then were ritually offered. Others argue that only some infants were sacrificed.

The account given by the Greco-Roman authors is questionable. They were not eye-witnesses, contradict each other on how the children were killed, and describe children older than infants being killed as opposed to the infants found in the tophets. The archaeological evidence is not consistent with the mechanical statue of Cronus mentioned by Cleitarchus and Diodorus. There are no references to child sacrifice in Greco-Roman accounts of the Punic Wars, which are better documented than the earlier periods in which mass child sacrifice is claimed. Many, but not all, Greco-Roman authors were hostile to the Carthaginians because they had been enemies in the Sicilian and Punic Wars and this may have influenced their presentation of the practice. Matthew McCarty argues that, even if the Greco-Roman testimonies are inaccurate "even the most fantastical slanders rely upon a germ of fact."

The archaeological evidence is ambiguous. An osteological study of the remains at Carthage by Jeffrey Schwartz et al. suggested 38% of a sample of 540 individuals had died before or during childbirth, based on the size of the bones, the development of teeth, and the absence of neonatal lines on teeth. Another osteological study of the same material challenged these findings, arguing that it had not taken account of the shrinkage of the bones caused by the burning process. The form of the deposits in tophets is different from Carthaginian graves for non-infants, which usually took the form of burials, not cremations. Phoenician grave goods are also different from the objects found with the human remains in tophets. However, cross-culturally, funerary practices for infants often differ from those for non-infants.

Many archaeologists argue that the ancient authors and the evidence of the Tophet indicates that all remains in the Tophet must have been sacrificed. Others argue that only some infants were sacrificed. Paolo Xella argues that "the principle of Occam’s Razor" indicates that the weight of classical and biblical sources indicate that the sacrifices occurred. He further argues that the number of children in the tophet is far smaller than the rate of natural infant mortality. In Xella's estimation, prenatal remains at the tophet are probably those of children who were promised to be sacrificed but died before birth, but who were nevertheless offered as a sacrifice in fulfillment of a vow. He concludes that

The legendary death of Carthage's first queen Elissa (Dido) by immolation, as well as the deaths of Hamilcar and the wife of Hasdrubal the Boetharch in the same manner, has been connected to the tophet ritual by some scholars. It is possible that the practice was more frequent in the earlier years of the city.

See also
 Kupala Night - a traditional Slavic holiday that involves a ritual of young people jumping over the flames of bonfires

References

Sources

External links
 "Tophet" in at Ancient History Encyclopedia

Child sacrifice
Christian eschatology
Gehenna
Hebrew Bible places
Jewish underworld
Phoenician funerary practices